The 2012 USASA Region IV National Cup was a qualifying tournament that determined which clubs from the fourth region of the United States Adult Soccer Association qualified for the first round proper of the 2012 U.S. Open Cup. The Region IV National Cup's group stage matches took place on 4–5 May 2012 with the championship match on 6 May 2012. The regional tournament was held at Ontario Soccer Park in Ontario, CA.

The winners of each group joined the 64-team field of the 2012 U.S. Open Cup. The winner of the championship match also advanced to the USASA National Cup final four in Chicago in mid-July.

Though Texas is officially in USASA Region III, El Paso-based EP Elite were given special permission to attempt to qualify through Region IV representing neighboring New Mexico, but then failed to show up to the tournament and forfeited all their matches.

Group stage

Group A

EP Elite forfeited all matches resulting in 3-0 wins for the remaining teams.

Group B

Advancing to Open Cup
  PSA Elite
  Cal FC

Final
Cal FC will represent Region IV in the 2012 USASA National Cup.

See also 
 2012 U.S. Open Cup
 2012 U.S. Open Cup qualification
 United States Adult Soccer Association

References

External links 

2012 U.S. Open Cup
2012
2012